Rutabaga (North American English) or swede (British English and some Commonwealth English) is a root vegetable, a form of Brassica napus (which also includes rapeseed).  Other names include Swedish turnip, neep (Scots), and turnip (Scottish and Canadian English, Irish English and Manx English). However, elsewhere the name "turnip" usually refers to the related white turnip. The species Brassica napus originated as a hybrid between the cabbage (Brassica oleracea) and the turnip (Brassica rapa).  Rutabaga roots are eaten as human food in various ways, and the leaves can be eaten as a leaf vegetable. The roots and tops are also used for livestock, either fed directly in the winter or foraged in the field during the other seasons. Scotland, Northern and Western England, Wales, the Isle of Man and Ireland had a tradition of carving the roots into lanterns at Halloween.

Etymology

Rutabaga has many national and regional names. Rutabaga is the common North American term for the plant. This comes from the Swedish dialectal word rotabagge, from rot (root) + bagge (lump, bunch). In the U.S., the plant is also known as Swedish turnip or yellow turnip.

The term swede (from "Swedish turnip") is used in many Commonwealth Nations, including much of England, Australia, and New Zealand. The name turnip is also used in parts of Northern and Midland England, the West Country (particularly Cornwall), Ireland, the Isle of Man, and Canada.

In Scotland, it is known as turnip, tumshie (also used as a pejorative term for foolish or stupid people) or neep (from Old English næp, Latin napus). Some areas of south-east Scotland, such as Berwickshire and Roxburghshire, still use the term baigie, possibly a derivative of the Swedish dialectal word rotabagge. The term turnip is also used for the white turnip (Brassica rapa ssp rapa).

Some will also refer to both swede and (white) turnip as just turnip (this word is also derived from næp). In north-east England, turnips and swedes are colloquially called snadgers, snaggers (archaic) or narkies. Rutabaga is also known as moot in the Isle of Man and the Manx language word for turnip is napin.

In Dutch, it is called similarly koolraap. In Denmark, Norway and the Netherlands, it is sometimes confused with kohlrabi.

History

The first known printed reference to the rutabaga comes from the Swiss botanist Gaspard Bauhin in 1620, where he notes that it was growing wild in Sweden. It is often considered to have originated in Scandinavia, Finland or Russia. According to the Natural Resources Institute of Finland (Luke), rutabaga or lanttu was most likely bred on more than one occasion in Northern Europe around the 16th century. Studies by former MTT (now Luke) have shown lanttu was developed independently in both Finland and Sweden from turnip and cabbage in connection with seed cultivation. There are contradictory accounts of how rutabaga arrived in England. Some sources say it arrived in England from Germany, while other accounts support Swedish origins. According to John Sinclair, the root vegetable arrived in England from Germany around 1750. Rutabaga arrived in Scotland by way of Sweden around 1781.

An article in The Gardeners' Chronicle suggests that the rutabaga was introduced more widely to England in 1790. Introduction to North America came in the early 19th century with reports of rutabaga crops in Illinois as early as 1817. In 1835, a rutabaga fodder crop was recommended to New York farmers in the Genesee River valley.

Rutabaga was once considered a food of last resort in both Germany and France due to its association with food shortages in World War I and World War II. Boiled stew with rutabaga and water as the only ingredients (Steckrübeneintopf) was a typical food in Germany during the famines and food shortages of World War I caused by the Allied blockade (the Steckrübenwinter or Turnip Winter of 1916–17) and between 1945 and 1949. As a result, many older Germans had unhappy memories of this food.

Botanical history
Rutabaga has a complex taxonomic history. The earliest account comes from the Swiss botanist Gaspard Bauhin, who wrote about it in his 1620 Prodromus. Brassica napobrassica was first validly published by Carl Linnaeus in his 1753 work Species Plantarum as a variety of B. oleracea: B. oleracea var. napobrassica. It has since been moved to other taxa as a variety, subspecies, or elevated to species rank. In 1768, a Scottish botanist elevated Linnaeus' variety to species rank as Brassica napobrassica in The Gardeners Dictionary.

Rutabaga has a chromosome number of 2n = 38. It originated from a cross between turnip (Brassica rapa) and Brassica oleracea. The resulting cross doubled its chromosomes, becoming an allopolyploid. This relationship was first published by Woo Jang-choon in 1935 and is known as the Triangle of U.

Cuisine

Europe

Netherlands 
In the Netherlands, rutabaga is traditionally served boiled and mashed. Adding mashed potatoes (and, in some recipes, similarly mashed vegetables or fruits) makes stamppot (English: mash pot), a dish often served alongside smoked sausage.

Poland 
During the difficult days of World War II, rutabaga and rutabaga juice were an important part of the local diet, and were consumed en masse.

Scandinavia

Sweden and Norway 

Onion is occasionally added. In Sweden,  is often eaten together with cured and boiled ham hock, accompanied by mustard. This classic Swedish dish is called .

Finland 
 
Finns eat and cook rutabaga in a variety of ways. Rutabaga is the major ingredient in the popular Christmas dish lanttulaatikko (rutabaga casserole), one of the three main casseroles served during Finnish Christmas, alongside the potato and carrot casseroles.

Uncooked and thinly julienned rutabaga is often served as a side dish salad in school and workplace lunches. Raisins or canned pineapple in light syrup are often added to the rutabaga salad. Sometimes, thinly sliced raw carrots are mixed with rutabaga.

Finns use rutabaga in most dishes that call for a root vegetable. Many Finnish soup bases consist of potatoes, carrots and rutabagas.

Finnish cuisine also roasts, bakes, boils and grills rutabagas. Oven-baked root vegetables are yet another home-cooking classic in Finland: rutabaga, carrots, beetroots and potatoes are roasted in the oven with salt and oil. Karjalanpaisti (Karelian hot pot) is a popular slow-cooking stew with root vegetables and meat cooked for a long time in a Dutch oven.

Finnish supermarkets sell alternative potato chips made out of root vegetables, such as rutabagas, beetroots and carrots.

Rutabagas are also an ingredient in Lanttukukko (Rutabaga-kukko, a traditional Savonian and Karelian dish).

United Kingdom

England 
In England, swede is boiled with carrots and mashed or pureed with butter and ground pepper. The flavoured cooking water is often retained for soup or as an addition to gravy. Swede is an essential vegetable component of the traditional Welsh lamb broth called cawl and Irish stew as eaten in England. Swede is also a component of the popular condiment Branston Pickle. The swede is also one of the four traditional ingredients of the pasty originating in Cornwall.

Scotland 
In Scotland, separately boiled and mashed, rutabagas (neeps) and potatoes are served as "neeps and tatties" ("tatties" being the Scots word for potatoes), in a traditional Burns supper, together with the main course of haggis (the Scottish national dish). Neeps mashed with carrots or potatoes are called clapshot. Roughly equal quantities of neeps and tatties are boiled in salted water and mashed with butter. Seasoning can be augmented with black pepper. Onions are never used. Regionally, neeps are a common ingredient in soups and stews.

Wales 

Outside Europe

Australia 
In Australia, swedes are used as a flavour enhancer in casseroles, stews and soups.

Canada 
In Canada, they are considered winter vegetables, as along with similar vegetables, they can be kept in a cold area or cellar for several months. They are primarily used as a side dish. They are also used as filler in foods such as mincemeat and Christmas cake.

New Zealand 
In New Zealand, they are more commonly available in winter but can be easily purchased for much of the year. It is thought they best grow in Southland, where the winters are colder. They are usually served mashed with butter but are often added to other dishes like casseroles or bakes.

United States 
In the US, rutabagas are not widely eaten but may be found as part of stews or casseroles, served mashed with carrots, or baked in a pasty. They are sometimes included in the New England boiled dinner.

Phytochemistry

Rutabaga and other cyanoglucoside-containing foods (including cassava, maize (corn), bamboo shoots, sweet potatoes, and lima beans) release cyanide, which is subsequently detoxified into thiocyanate. Thiocyanate inhibits thyroid iodide transport and, at high doses, competes with iodide in the organification process within thyroid tissue. Goitres may develop when there is a dietary imbalance of thiocyanate-containing food in excess of iodine consumption, and these compounds can contribute to hypothyroidism. Yet, there have been no reports of ill effects in humans from the consumption of glucosinolates from normal amounts of Brassica vegetables. Glucosinolate content in Brassica vegetables is around one percent of dry matter. These compounds also cause the bitter taste of rutabaga.

As with watercress, mustard greens, turnip, broccoli and horseradish, human perception of bitterness in rutabaga is governed by a gene affecting the TAS2R bitter receptor, which detects the glucosinolates in rutabaga. Sensitive individuals with the genotype PAV/PAV (supertasters) find rutabaga twice as bitter as insensitive subjects (AVI/AVI). The difference for the mixed type (PAV/AVI) is insignificant for rutabaga. As a result, sensitive individuals may find some rutabagas too bitter to eat.

Other chemical compounds that contribute to flavour and odour include glucocheirolin, glucobrassicanapin, glucoberteroin, gluconapoleiferin, and glucoerysolin. Several phytoalexins that aid in defence against plant pathogens have also been isolated from the rutabaga, including three novel phytoalexins that were reported in 2004.

Rutabaga contains significant amounts of vitamin C: 100 g contains 25 mg, 30% of the daily recommended dose.

Other uses

Livestock
The roots and tops of "swedes" came into use as a forage crop in the early nineteenth century, used as winter feed for livestock. They may be fed directly (chopped or from a hopper), or animals may be allowed to forage the plants directly in the field.

Halloween

People in Northern England, West England, Ireland and Scotland have long carved turnips and often use them as lanterns to ward off harmful spirits. In the Middle Ages, rowdy bands of children roamed the streets in masks carrying carved turnips known in Scotland as "tumshie heads". In modern times, turnips are often carved to look as sinister and threatening as possible and are put in the window or on the doorstep of a house at Halloween to ward off evil spirits.

Since pumpkins became readily available in Europe in the 1980s, they have taken over this role to a large extent. In the Isle of Man, turnip lanterns are still carved at Hop-tu-Naa (Manx equivalent of Halloween), lit with a candle or electric torch, and carried from house to house by some children, with the accompanying Hop tu Naa song; hoping for money or treats of food. The smell of burning turnip is an evocative part of the event.

Festivals
A local farmers' market in the town of Ithaca, New York, organizes what it calls the "International Rutabaga Curling Championship" annually on the last day of the market season. The villages of Askov, Minnesota, and Cumberland, Wisconsin, both hold an annual "rutabaga festival" in August.

See also
 List of vegetables

References

External links

 Alternative Field Crops Manual: Rutabaga—Center for New Crops & Plant Products, Purdue University
 Smillie, Susan. "Are 'neeps' swedes or turnips?", The Guardian, 25 January 2010.

Brassica
Halloween food
Leaf vegetables
Plants described in 1753
Taxa named by Carl Linnaeus
Root vegetables